Sherman Chauncey Bishop (1887–1951) was a herpetologist and arachnologist from New York. He studied at Cornell University and, with Cyrus R. Crosby, gave the spruce-fir moss spider its scientific name. His Handbook of Salamanders (1943) was the first serious and comprehensive treatment of North American salamanders since Cope (1889).

Bishop is commemorated in the scientific names of two species of salamanders: Ambystoma bishopi and Cryptobranchus bishopi.

Publications
Bishop, Sherman C. (1943). Handbook of Salamanders: The Salamanders of the United States, and of Lower California. Ithaca and London: Comstock Publishing Associates, a division of Cornell University Press. 508 pp.

References

1887 births
1951 deaths
American arachnologists
American herpetologists
Cornell University College of Agriculture and Life Sciences alumni
20th-century American zoologists